Herman Ekeberg (born 14 March 1972) is a former Norwegian professional football defender playing for Norwegian team Aalesunds FK. After his last active season, 2006, he continued working for the club, focusing on marketing. Herman started his career with Mjøndalen IF.

References

External links
 Herman Ekeberg profile at altomfotball.no

1972 births
Living people
Norwegian footballers
Eliteserien players
Mjøndalen IF players
Aalesunds FK players
Association football defenders